was the Tokugawa shogunate's officially sanctioned cinnabar monopoly or cinnabar guild (za) which was created in 1609.

Initially, the Tokugawa shogunate was interested in assuring a consistent value in minted coins; and this led to the perceived need for attending to the supply of cinnabar.

This bakufu title identifies a regulatory agency with responsibility for supervising the handling and trading of cinnabar and for superintending all cinnabar mining and cinnabar-extraction activities in Japan.

See also
 Bugyō
 Kinzan-bugyō
 Kinza – Gold za (monopoly office or guild).
 Ginza – Silver za (monopoly office or guild).
 Dōza – Copper za (monopoly office or guild)

Notes

References
 Hall, John W. (1955). Tanuma Okitsugu, 1719–1788: Forerunner of Modern Japan.  Cambridge: Harvard University Press.  OCLC 445621
 Jansen, Marius B. (1995). Warrior Rule in Japan. Cambridge: Cambridge University Press. ;  OCLC 422791897
 Schaede, Ulrike. (2000). Cooperative Capitalism: Self-Regulation, Trade Associations, and the Antimonopoly Law in Japan.  Oxford: Oxford University Press. ;  OCLC 505758165
 Takekoshi, Yosaburo. (1930).  The Economic Aspects of the History of the Civilization of Japan. New York: Macmillan Publishers. OCLC 313511699

Government of feudal Japan
Officials of the Tokugawa shogunate
Economy of feudal Japan
1609 establishments in Japan
Monopolies
Guilds in Japan